The Hong Kong T20 Blitz was a cricket competition in Hong Kong that was first played in 2016. The inaugural event consisted of four franchised teams playing in a Twenty20 format only. Kowloon Cantons and Woodworm Island Warriors were joint winners of the inaugural DTC Hong Kong T20 Blitz after rain washed out finals day.

In July 2019, the competition was cancelled, due to ongoing financial issues.

History 

The Cricket Hong Kong (CHK) announced their plans for the event in April 2016, stating they would invest in a Twenty20 cricket league for the development cricket in Hong Kong as well as in nearby countries. The competition would launch with four teams playing in a Twenty20 format. Cricket Hong Kong announced that DTC Mobiles will sponsor the tournament.

Before the second season, Leonine Sports Group acquired the Woodworm Island Warriors, changing the name to Hong Kong Island (HKI) United. A new fifth franchise was also added and named City KaiTak.

Teams 

Cricket Hong Kong announced the four hosts for the Hong Kong T20 Blitz League in April 2016, with hosting rights awarded for the first years of the competition. Team names, along with the fixtures and venues for the 2016 season, were announced in April 2016. The allocation of domestic players was decided by a draft held on April 28, 2016. All four franchises also subsequently signed a number of international players. Tanwir Afzal, captain of the Hong Kong national cricket team, was selected as the first pick in the inaugural draft for tournament by Woodworm Island Warriors. Since 2017 a fifth team has been added & five Chinese players were taken up by the five franchises in their squad, although as of 2018 they are yet to be given any significant role or opportunity in the playing XI.

Tournament results

Format 

The 2016 event took place on 29 and 30 May. The four teams played each other once in a round-robin format, followed by a finals day. All the matches were played at Mission Road Ground, Mong Kok.

The 2017 event took place from 8 to 12 March. The five teams played each other once in a round-robin format, followed by a finals day. All the matches were played at the Mission Road Ground, Mong Kok.

Media coverage 

Coverage of Hong Kong T20 Blitz 2016 was broadcast live on Hong Kong Cricket Association’s YouTube channel. Dean Jones, Jack Richards and Fox Sports’ Katherine Loughnan were hosts and also part of the commentary team.

International broadcasters

References

External links 
 Cricinfo Home

 
Hong Kong domestic cricket competitions
2016 establishments in Hong Kong
Twenty20 cricket leagues
Sports competitions in Hong Kong
Sports leagues in Hong Kong
Sports leagues established in 2016
Recurring sporting events established in 2016
Cricket in Hong Kong